Jung-hoon, also spelled Jung-hun or Jeong-hun, is a Korean masculine given name. The meaning differs based on the hanja used to write each syllable of the name. There are 65 hanja with the reading "jung" and 12 hanja with the reading "hoon" on the South Korean government's official list of hanja which may be used in given names. It was a popular name for baby boys in South Korea in the mid-to-late 20th century, coming in tenth place in 1960, first place in 1970, and third place in 1980.

People with this name include:
Kim Jong-hun (footballer, born 1956), North Korean footballer
Kang Jung-hoon (born 1976), South Korean footballer
Yeon Jung-hoon (born 1978), South Korean actor
Kim Jeong-hoon (born 1980), South Korean singer and actor
Kang Jung-hun (born 1987), South Korean footballer
Park Jung-hoon (footballer) (born 1988), South Korean footballer
Kim Jung-hoon (footballer, born 1989), South Korean footballer
Im Jung-hoon (born 1990), stage name J-Hoon, South Korean singer, member of B.I.G
Kim Jeong-hoon (footballer, born 1991), South Korean football player
Lee Jung-hoon (born 1991), stage name Yoon So-ho, South Korean actor 
Wang Jeung-hun (born 1995), South Korean golfer
Moon Jung-hoon, South Korean paralympic athlete
Lee Jung-hoon (born 2000), South Korean singer, former member of 1TEAM
Han Jung-hoon (born 2000), formerly known as J-Kid, South Korean singer, former member of ENOi, current member of Omega X

See also
List of Korean given names

References

Korean masculine given names